The following are the national records in track cycling in Russia maintained by Russia's national cycling federation: Russian Cycling Federation.

Men
Key to tables:

Women

References
General
Russian records  21 December 2022 updated
Specific

External links
Russian Cycling Federation web site

Russia
Records
Track cycling
track cycling